Norman Ackroyd  (born 26 March 1938) is an English artist known primarily for his aquatint work. He lives and is based in Bermondsey, London.

Background
Ackroyd was born on 26 March 1938 in Leeds, Yorkshire. He attended Leeds College of Art from 1957 to 1961 and the Royal College of Art, London, from 1961 to 1964, where he studied under Julian Trevelyan. Subsequently, he lived for several years in the United States. He was elected to the Royal Academy of Art in 1988 and appointed Professor of Etching, University of the Arts, in 1994. He was elected Senior Fellow of the Royal College of Art in 2000, and in 2007 was made CBE for services to Engraving and Printing.

His daughter Poppy Ackroyd is a composer and musician.

His son Simeon Ackroyd is an artist.

Work

In the 1980s Ackroyd emerged as a landscape artist. Central Saint Martins College of Art and Design mounted a retrospective exhibition of these works in 2006 and kept an archive of his work. His works range from minimalist, nearly abstract impressions, to detailed images. His work almost never includes the human figure, the landscape subjects are often of old human habitation. His prints range from tiny etchings intended to be bound into books to huge etchings. His preferred medium for working directly on paper is watercolour, including a recent project pairing his watercolors with poems by Kevin Crossley-Holland, published under the title Moored Man. He has also designed a number of large-scale, etched reliefs in steel or bronze commissioned for architectural projects in London, Moscow, Birmingham, and Glasgow.
Recently completed projects include a mural at the Sainsbury Laboratory Cambridge University, showing scenes from the Galapagos, and a door at Great Portland Estates in London, W1. See also published works such as The Stratton Street Series (introduction by Ian Ritchie).

With Douglas Dunn, he has recently published A Line in the Water; the book was designed by Isambard Thomas. Ackroyd's working methods are described in an issue of Archipelago (No. III, Spring 2009).

Ackroyd's work can be found in several British and American galleries including the Zillah Bell Gallery (which holds the largest collection of his work in the North of England), the Tate, the British Museum, and the National Gallery of Art, Washington. He has been in several television programmes, including BBC documentaries in 1980, 2006, and What Do Artists Do All Day? (2013).

References

External links

 
Sainsbury Laboratory building project info
Norman Ackroyd, portraits at the National Portrait Gallery
Norman Ackroyd on Frank Brangwyn's press.

1938 births
Living people
Royal Academicians
English printmakers
Artists from Leeds
Alumni of the Royal College of Art
Commanders of the Order of the British Empire
Alumni of Leeds Arts University